Fernando Po may refer to:
Fernando Po (island) in Equatorial Guinea, now called Bioko
Fernão do Pó, Portuguese explorer
Fernando Pó, village in Palmela, Portugal
Fernando Pó halt, railway halt in Palmela, Portugal

See also
Fernando Poe (disambiguation)